Hurricane Darby was a large and powerful tropical cyclone that caused minor damage in Mexico and California, despite remaining offshore. Darby was the sixth named storm, third hurricane, and third major hurricane of the extremely active 1992 Pacific hurricane season. The origins of Darby were from a tropical wave which moved off the coast of Africa on June 19. It traversed the Atlantic, and moved across Mexico, where it re-emerged in the Pacific on June 29 and became a tropical depression on July 2, a tropical storm on July 5, and a hurricane on July 6. The storm remained well offshore, although it killed three people.

Meteorological history

The origins of Darby can be traced back to a tropical wave that emerged off the African coast on June 19. The wave tracked westward across the Atlantic Ocean without further development, eventually passing over the Caribbean Sea and tracked over Mexico. The wave reached in the Pacific on June 29, as its organization began to improve. The system was designated Tropical Depression 5-E on July 2 while moving southwest as it continued to organize. On July 4, the depression attained tropical storm status and was named "Darby". The tropical storm intensified to hurricane status as it brushed by the southern tip of Baja California. Although the storm remained well offshore, it contained a large circulation which produced tropical storm force winds extending up to 300 miles (480 km) away from the center.
As Darby passed by, Socorro Island recorded a minimum pressure of 974 hPa.
The storm then reached its peak intensity of 968 hPa before beginning a weakening trend due to colder waters.

The hurricane, now as a Category 2 hurricane on the Saffir-Simpson Hurricane Scale, was moving to the northwest near 20 mph (32 km/h).
Darby continued on a northwest track as it moved away from the Baja California on July 6.
As the storm moved over cooler waters, deep convection decreased, and Darby was downgraded to a tropical storm on July 7.
Darby, now losing tropical characteristics, was downgraded to a tropical depression on July 9.
Darby soon dissipated, and moved into the southwest United States producing light rainfall.
By July 10, Darby had lost all of its tropical characteristics. As the remnant low pressure meandered across the southwest United States it moved north, and tracked offshore of California, where it persisted as a remnant low and produced shower activity to parts of California.

Preparations and Impact
Although Darby remained well offshore, the large size of the hurricane's circulation prompted the government of Mexico to issue tropical storm warnings for the southern tip of Baja California.

The United States Coast Guard reported two separate boating accidents in Los Angeles, which were directly related to Darby. The first was a boat that experienced engine failure off the California coast.
The seven people on board abandoned the boat, and were rescued. The second report was a boat that reported to be taking on water off the coast of California, on July 8. A news source also reported that a tuna fishing boat experienced technical difficulties, but this is not official.

The effects from Darby were mostly minor, with three deaths reported by a Mexican newspaper. Four fishermen were reported missing, and onshore, 180 small stores were damaged along the Acapulco city port. Rainfall was mainly light, although some locations picked up 5 inches (125 mm). In California, Darby's remnants produced overcast skies around the Edwards Air Force Base. This caused the landing of the Space Shuttle Columbia to be postponed for a day at the conclusion of STS-50, as well as the landing happening at Kennedy Space Center. Darby produced high humidity, fog, and heavy rain around Los Angeles. A  fell in San Diego, setting daily records.

See also

 Tropical cyclones in 1992
 List of Category 3 Pacific hurricanes
 Other storms of the same name
 List of California hurricanes
 Hurricane Dolores (2015) – Remnants brought heavy record rainfall to Southern California.

References

Darby 1992
Darby
Darby 1992
Darby 1992
1992 natural disasters in the United States
1992 in California
1992 in Mexico